Castile, Castille or Castilla may refer to:

Places

Spain
Castile (historical region), a vaguely defined historical region of Spain covering most of Castile and León, all of the Community of Madrid and most of Castilla–La Mancha
Kingdom of Castile, one of the medieval kingdoms of the Iberian peninsula, 1065–1230
Crown of Castile, a medieval state in the Iberian Peninsula that formed in 1230
Two regions of the Kingdom of Spain (until 1982):
Old Castile, in the north
New Castile (Spain), in the south
Two contemporary autonomous communities of Spain:
Castile and León, in the north
Castilla–La Mancha, in the south

Elsewhere
Castile, New York
Castile (village), New York
Castilla District, Piura Province, Peru
Castilla de Oro, name given by Spanish in 16th century to Central American territories
Governorate of New Castile, modern Peru
Castilla, Sorsogon, municipality in Sorsogon, Philippines

Other uses
 Castile (surname)
 Castilians, inhabitants of the historical region of Castile, Spain
 Castilla (Vino de la Tierra), Spanish name for wines in Castile-La Mancha
 Castilia (butterfly), genus of brush-footed butterflies
 Castilla (plant), genus of rubber trees
 Castile soap, made with olive oil from the Castile region of Spain
 Auberge de Castille, the office of the Prime Minister of Malta
 Real Madrid Castilla, the reserve team of Real Madrid
 The Castiles, first group to include Bruce Springsteen
 Castille, a fictional character in Phantom Brave
 Spanish ship Castilla, any of 12 ships from the Spanish Navy
 Honduran ship Castilla, torpedoed by German submarine U-107 during World War II
 Kastilà, Tagalog word for the Spaniards in the Philippines

See also 
 Castell (disambiguation)
 Castella (disambiguation)
 Castelli (disambiguation)
 Castello (disambiguation)
 Castells (disambiguation)
 Castiel (disambiguation)
 Castilian (disambiguation)
 Castillo (disambiguation)
 New Castile (disambiguation)